McKinley County is a county in the northwestern section of the U.S. state of New Mexico. As of the 2020 United States Census, its population was 71,367. Its county seat is Gallup. The county was created in 1901 and named for President William McKinley.

McKinley County is Gallup's micropolitan statistical area.

Geography

Adjacent counties
 San Juan County - north
 Sandoval County - east
 Cibola County - south
 Apache County, Arizona - west

Major highways
  Interstate 40
  U.S. Route 491 (formerly )
 New Mexico Highway 264
 New Mexico Highway 371
 New Mexico Highway 602

National protected areas
 Chaco Culture National Historical Park (part)
 Cibola National Forest (part)

Demographics

2000 census
As of the 2000 census,  74,798 people, 21,476 households, and 16,686 families were living in the county.  The population density was 14 people per square mile (5/km2).  The 26,718 housing units had an average density of 5 per square mile (2/km2).  The racial makeup of the county was 74.72% Native American, 16.39% White, 0.46% Asian, 0.40% African American, 0.04% Pacific Islander, 5.47% from other races, and 2.52% from two or more races.  About 12.40% of the population were Hispanics or Latinos of any race.

Of the 21,476 households, 46.0% had children under 18 living with them, 47.7% were married couples living together, 22.7% had a female householder with no husband present, and 22.3% were not families. About 19.5% of all households were made up of individuals, and 5.3% had someone living alone who was 65 or older.  The average household size was 3.44, and the average family size was 3.99.

In the county, the age distribution was 38.0% under 18, 9.7% from 18 to 24, 27.8% from 25 to 44, 17.6% from 45 to 64, and 6.9% who were 65 or older.  The median age was 27 years. For every 100 females, there were 93.50 males.  For every 100.0 females 18 and over, there were 89.3 males.

The median income for a household in the county was $25,005, and for a family was $26,806. Males had a median income of $26,963 versus $21,014 for females. The per capita income for the county was $9,872.  About 31.9% of families and 36.1% of the population were below the poverty line, including 42.3% of those under 18 and 31.5% of those 65 or over. The county's per capita income makes it one of the poorest counties in the United States.

McKinley County is one of only 38 county-level census divisions of the United States where the most spoken language is not English and one of only three where it is neither English nor Spanish; 45.75% of the population speak Navajo at home, followed by English at 38.87%, Zuñi at 9.03%, and Spanish at 5.72%.

2010 census
As of the 2010 census,  71,492 people, 21,968 households, and 16,219 families resided in the county. The racial makeup of the county was 75.5% Native American, 15.2% White, 0.8% Asian, 0.5% Black or African American, 4.9% from other races, and 3.1% from two or more races. Those of Hispanic or Latino origin made up 13.3% of the population.

Of the 21,968 households, 46.2% had children under 18 living with them, 40.8% were married couples living together, 24.5% had a female householder with no husband present, 26.2% were not families, and 22.4% of all households were made up of individuals. The average household size was 3.22, and the average family size was 3.82. The median age was 30.7 years.

The median income for a household in the county was $31,335 and for a family was $37,345. Males had a median income of $31,527 versus $26,236 for females. The per capita income for the county was $12,932. About 26.6% of families and 33.4% of the population were below the poverty line, including 43.0% of those under 18 and 31.3% of those 65 or over.

Communities

City
 Gallup (county seat)

Census-designated places

 Becenti
 Black Hat
 Black Rock 
 Bluewater
 Borrego Pass
 Brimhall Nizhoni 
 Catalpa Canyon
 Church Rock 
 Continental Divide
 Crestview
 Crownpoint 
 Crystal (part)
 Fort Wingate
 Gamerco
 Haystack
 Homer C Jones
 Iyanbito
 Jamestown
 Manuelito
 McGaffey
 Nakaibito 
 Navajo 
 Ojo Encino
 Pinedale
 Pinehaven
 Prewitt
 Pueblo Pintado
 Purty Rock 
 Ramah 
 Red Rock Ranch
 Rock Springs 
 Sagar
 Sundance
 Thoreau 
 Timberlake (part)
 Tohatchi 
 Tse Bonito 
 Twin Lakes 
 Vanderwagen
 White Cliffs
 Williams Acres
 Yah-ta-hey 
 Zuni Pueblo

Unincorporated communities

 Buffalo Springs
 Chi Chil Tah
 Rehoboth
 Smith Lake

Education

Locally controlled public schools in most of McKinley County are run by Gallup-McKinley County Schools, the local school district, and include Crownpoint High School, Gallup Central High School, Gallup High School, Hiroshi Miyamura High School, Navajo Pine High School, Ramah Middle / High School, Thoreau High School, Tohatchi High School, and Tse Yi Gai High School. Areas in and around the Zuni reservation are in the Zuni Public School District, which operates Zuni High School.

Two Bureau of Indian Education (BIE) boarding schools are in the Fort Wingate area: Wingate Elementary School, and Wingate High School. The BIE also operates a K-8 school, Pueblo Pintado Community School, in Pueblo Pintado, and a K-6 school, Baca /Dlo'Ay Azhi Community School. Additionally, a tribal school affiliated with the BIE, Ch'ooshgai Community School, is located in Tohatchi.

Politics
During its early history from 1912 to 1928, McKinley County voted for the Republican candidate in every presidential election. From 1932 onward, the county, with its large Native American majority, has backed Democratic candidates in all but three presidential elections that were national landslides for the Republican Party.

See also

 National Register of Historic Places listings in McKinley County, New Mexico

References

 
1901 establishments in New Mexico Territory
Populated places established in 1901